Papilio nephelus is a species of swallowtail butterfly belonging to the family Papilionidae. Subspecies include P. n. chaon, the yellow Helen, and P. n. sunatus, the black and white Helen.

Description

The basic colour of the wings is black, with a chain of white spots on the forewing and a large white or yellow area on the hindwing. The underside and the upperside of the wings in this species are very similar. The hindwings have wavy margins, with long tails. The thorax and the abdomen are black.

Papilio nephelus superficially closely resembles P. helenus. The differences are, however, both of structure and of colour. Male forewing upperside: entirely without the thick coating of short hairs on the outer half. Upperside: black with a sprinkling of yellowish-brown scales on the forewing, that form four longitudinal streaks on the cell and internervular streaks on the outer half. Hindwing: the upper discal white patch larger, formed of elongate broad streaks in interspaces 4 to 7 (not 5 to 7): no tornal nor subterminal markings. Underside ground colour duller brownish black; forewing with the diffuse scaling so disposed as to form grey cellular and internervular streaks, the streaks in interspaces 1a and 1 generally white, not diffuse. Hindwing: basal area sprinkled with yellow scales that form three longitudinal slender lines in the cell: the upper white discal patch as on the upperside, but the elongate white markings that compose it well divided by the black veins; below the discal white patch there is a small series of white spots in interspaces 1 to 3, the spot in 1 generally, in 2 very often, tinged with ochraceous yellow; a subterminal complete series of ochraceous-yellow lunules followed by admarginal narrow white spots. Antennae, head, thorax, and abdomen black; beneath: a line of white on the palpi, the thorax with some linear white markings.

Female similar. Upperside ground colour browner; forewing: cellular and internervular streaks more prominent; in many specimens an obscure diffuse whitish subcostal shading just beyond apex of coll. Underside paler. Forewing with the cellular and internervular streaks and subcostal postcellular whitish patch more prominent; the posterior three internervular short streaks on the outer half of the wing white, not diffuse; in a few specimens there is a series of more or less conspicuous admarginal white spots, one in the middle of each interspace. Hindwing markings similar to those in the male, but larger and more prominent. Antennae, head, thorax, and abdomen as in the male, but the abdomen beneath with lateral white markings.

Larvae feed on Toddalia asiatica, Euodia meliifolia, Fagra rhetsa, Citrus species and Zanthoxylum rhetsa.

Range
This species can be found the Asian part of the Palaearctic realm and partially in the Australasian realm and in the Indomalayan realm, from Nepal, Sikkim, Assam, to the south of China, and from Myanmar to Thailand, Cambodia and Indonesia.

Habitat
These butterflies are mainly present in the lowlands in the primary forests.

Gallery

Subspecies
Listed alphabetically:
 Papilio nephelus albolineatus Forbes, 1885 – (Sumatra, Borneo)
 Papilio nephelus annulus Pendlebury, 1936 – (Peninsular Malaya)
 Papilio nephelus chaon Westwood, 1845 – yellow Helen (Orissa, Nepal - Assam, northern Burma, southern Yunnan)
 Papilio nephelus chaonulus Fruhstorfer, 1902 – (southern China, Haina, Taiwan)
 Papilio nephelus ducenarius Fruhstorfer, 1908 – (southern Burma, Tenasserim)
 Papilio nephelus nephelus – (Java)
 Papilio nephelus siporanus Hagen, 1898 – (Mentawej Island)
 Papilio nephelus sunatus Corbet, 1940 – black and white Helen (Peninsular Malaya)
 Papilio nephelus tellonus Fruhstorfer, 1906 – (Batu Islands)
 Papilio nephelus uranus Weymer, 1885 – (Nias)

Taxonomy
Papilio nephelus is a member of the helenus species group. The members of this clade are:
Papilio helenus Linnaeus, 1758
Papilio iswara White, 1842
Papilio iswaroides Fruhstorfer, 1898
Papilio nephelus Boisduval, 1836
Papilio nubilus Staudinger, 1895
Papilio sataspes C. & R. Felder, 1865

See also
Papilionidae
List of butterflies of India
List of butterflies of India (Papilionidae)

References

Other reading

External links
 Papilio nephelus chaon
 Papilio nephelus sunatus
 Papilio nephelus sunatus
 Papilio nephelus, Butterflycorner

nephelus
Butterflies of Asia
Butterflies of Indochina
Butterflies described in 1836